The Jock Scott is a dressed salmon fly created in 1850 by John (Jock) Scott, born at Branxholm in Roxburghshire in 1817.

The Jock Scott has been used as a metaphor for fly fishing in general. The protagonist of The Edwardians by Vita Sackville-West is described as follows at the coronation of George V: "He was bored, he was disgusted; he wished that he might be casting a Jock Scott into the Tay."

History
The Jock Scott was created in 1850.  See David Zincavage's article for more details.

Tying instructions
The materials used in this fly are shown in the infobox.  Many of the original components are from rare birds.

References

Artificial flies